John Gorham Palfrey (March 12, 1919 – October 28, 1979) was an American academic, administrator, and government official. He was a professor at law at Columbia University and served as dean of Columbia College from 1958 to 1962. He also served on the United States Atomic Energy Commission from 1962 to 1966.

Biography 
Palfrey was born in Beacon Hill, Boston, and graduated from Milton Academy and Harvard College in 1940, where he was classmates with John F. Kennedy. He was a great-grandson of Massachusetts Congressman John G. Palfrey and the first dean of Harvard Divinity School. His grandfather, Francis Winthrop Palfrey, was an American historian and Civil War officer. His family is descended from William Palfrey, who served in the American Revolutionary War as aide-de-camp to George Washington.

He also studied at Harvard Law School before his studies were interrupted by World War II, during which he served in the Army Signal Corps and with the military intelligence at The Pentagon, retiring as a first lieutenant. After law school, he served on the staff of the Atomic Energy Commission's general counsel for three years and spent two years at the Institute for Advanced Study in Princeton, New Jersey.

Palfrey joined the Columbia faculty in 1952, becoming a full professor in 1956. He was appointed dean of the undergraduate liberal arts college before being appointed by President Kennedy to serve on the Atomic Energy Commission, and remained in that position under President Lyndon B. Johnson.

After concluding his term at the commission, Palfrey served as a fellow at the Harvard Institute of Politics, Woodrow Wilson International Center for Scholars, and the Brookings Institution.

Personal life 
In 1942, Palfrey married Clochette Roosevelt, a granddaughter of President Theodore Roosevelt and a daughter of Kermit Roosevelt. Their wedding was attended by Franklin D. Roosevelt and Eleanor Roosevelt.

His sister Sarah Palfrey Cooke was a tennis player who won two singles, nine women's doubles, and four mixed doubles titles at the U.S. National Championships, and his other four sisters have each won a national junior title.

He died on October 28, 1979, at age 60 in Boston. His son, Sean Palfrey, married Judith Palfrey. Both of them are professors of medicine at Boston University School of Medicine and Harvard Medical School, respectively. His grandson, John Palfrey, served on the faculty of Harvard Law School and was the head of school of Phillips Academy. He is currently the President of the MacArthur Foundation. His other grandson, Quentin Palfrey, currently serves as Deputy General Counsel at the United States Department of Commerce and was a Democratic candidate in the 2018 Massachusetts election for lieutenant governor.

References 

1919 births
1979 deaths
Columbia University faculty
Harvard College alumni
Harvard Law School alumni
Milton Academy alumni
Kennedy administration personnel
Lyndon B. Johnson administration personnel
Roosevelt family
People from Beacon Hill, Boston